Spatulignatha is a genus of moth in the family Lecithoceridae.

Species
Spatulignatha arcuata Liu & Wang, 2014
Spatulignatha chrysopteryx Wu, 1994
Spatulignatha hemichrysa (Meyrick, 1910)
Spatulignatha idiogena C.S. Wu, 1994
Spatulignatha longizonalis Liu & Wang, 2014
Spatulignatha olaxana C.S.Wu, 1994

References
Natural History Museum Lepidoptera genus database

 
Lecithocerinae
Moth genera